Otto Sander (30 June 1941 – 12 September 2013) was a German film, theater, and voice actor.

Life

Education and early career 
Sander grew up in Kassel, where he graduated in 1961 from the Friedrichgymnasium. After leaving school he spent his military service in 1961/62 with the Bundesmarine and left as reserve fenrik. Sander then studied theatre science, history of art and philosophy. In 1965 he made his acting debut at the Düsseldorfer chamber plays. After his first film work in the same year he abandoned his studies in 1967, and went to Munich to become a full-time actor.

Theatre 
His career is closely connected with the Schaubühne theatre in Berlin under the direction of Peter Stein. From 1980 onwards Sander appeared on several of Berlin's theatre stages, among others at the Schillertheater in 1981, at the Freie Volksbühne in 1985 and in 1989 at the Komödie am Kurfürstendamm. More recently he starred in Hauptmann von Köpenick at the Schauspielhaus Bochum (2004).

Film 
Among his best-known film roles are the angel Cassiel in Wings of Desire and its sequel Faraway, So Close! by Wim Wenders, and a shell-shocked U-boat commander, Kapitänleutnant Philipp Thomsen, in Wolfgang Petersen's Das Boot. Sander also appeared in The Tin Drum (1979) as a trumpeter and in Comedian Harmonists, a biopic about the musical group of the same name. He also played a professor in the movie The Promise about the division of Berlin by the wall. In 1999 he played a role in Rosa von Praunheim's movie The Einstein of Sex.

In 1990, he was a member of the Jury at the 40th Berlin International Film Festival.

Voice acting 
Because of his warm, strong voice, which earned him the sobriquet "The Voice" (the English term is used), he has been used frequently as narrator for television documentaries, and numerous talking books in the 1990s.

Personal life and death 
He was married to the actress Monika Hansen and was stepfather to the actors Ben Becker and Meret Becker. He had two brothers, the lawyer Adolf Sander, the scientist Chris Sander, and a sister, the book dealer Marianne Sander.

Sander died, aged 72, in Berlin on 12 September 2013. No cause of death was given, though he had been diagnosed with cancer several years before his death.

Filmography

As Actor

As Narrator

References

External links 

1941 births
2013 deaths
Actors from Hanover
German male film actors
German male stage actors
German male television actors
German male voice actors
20th-century German male actors
21st-century German male actors